Cazeau or Cazeaux may refer to:

Places 
 Cazeaux-de-Larboust, a commune in Haute-Garonne, France
 Cazeau River, north shore tributary of the Saint Lawrence river, in Château-Richer, La Côte-de-Beaupré Regional County Municipality, Capitale-Nationale, Quebec, Canada

Surname 
 Cyril Cazeaux (born 1995), rugby player